A187 may refer to:

 A187 road in England from Heaton, Newcastle to North Shields
 HMS Forth (A187), Royal Navy submarine depot ship
 RMAS Salmaid (A187), Royal Navy Sal-Class mooring and salvage vessel